The A13 is a major road in England linking Central London with east London and south Essex. Its route is similar to that of the London, Tilbury and Southend line via Rainham, Grays, Tilbury & Stanford-Le-Hope, and runs the entire length of the northern Thames Gateway area, terminating on the Thames Estuary at Shoeburyness. It is a trunk road between London and the Tilbury junction, a primary route between there and Sadlers Hall Farm near South Benfleet, and a non-primary route between there and Shoeburyness.

Route

London

The A13 used to start at Aldgate Pump; but now begins at the junction with the A11 at what used to be the Aldgate one way system in east London and heads eastwards through the boroughs of Tower Hamlets, Newham, Barking & Dagenham and Havering before reaching the Greater London boundary.

Commercial Road and East India Dock Road
At the central London end, Commercial Road and East India Dock Road form one of two main arteries through the historic East End (the other being the A11 Whitechapel Road). The A13 route is a relatively recent addition to London's radial network, having been built at the beginning of the 19th century to connect the City with the (then) newly expanding Docklands area. Commercial Road dates from 1802, while East India Dock Road  was set out from 1806–1812. The first iron bridge across the River Lea was built in 1810. Today the route is still largely single carriageway, though notable is the junction with the A12 and A102 at the northern portal of the Blackwall Tunnel. This section of A13 is used by the important London Bus routes 15 (as far as Blackwall) and 115.

East Ham & Barking By-pass (Newham Way and Alfreds Way)

However, just east of Blackwall, at the crossing of the River Lea, there is a TOTSO (turn-off to stay on) with the A1261 East India Dock Link Tunnel, and the road changes character dramatically, becoming a dual three-lane expressway. This grade-separated route continues all the way to the Greater London Boundary. Notable junctions include Canning Town, and the A406 junction near Beckton, as well as the single carriageway Lodge Avenue flyover near Barking, where the old A13 route (Ripple Road) merges with the new. Grade-separated in 2002–2004, the dual carriageway section through Newham is Newham Way, while through Barking it is Alfreds Way, both comprising the East Ham & Barking Bypass, and originally dualled by the 1960s. This section is structurally sound and built to high standards, but was subject to a 40 mph (64 km/h) speed limit. Prior to grade-separation, the speed limit was 50 mph (80 km/h). Works involved inserting new underpasses at Prince Regent and Movers Lane, a new flyover at Beckton Alps, and expanding Canning Town flyover from two lanes either way to three. Also inserted was the free-flow link to the A1261 tunnel. London Bus route 173 is the only route to use the A13 here, between Beckton Alps and Ripple Road. However, the speed limit was increased back to 50 mph in 2011.

Ripple Road and the Thames Gateway
East of the Lodge Avenue junction near Barking, the route then takes over the much older Ripple Road, with its last at-grade junction at Renwick Road, while the all-new grade-separated section east of the Goresbrook Interchange at Dagenham is termed the Thames Gateway, completed in 1999. This is notable for the award-winning viaduct over Fords works, opening in late 1999, and the causeway over Rainham and Wennington Marshes, the latter structure causing some delay to the project due to necessary studies on its environmental impact, although this section opened first, in mid-1997. The contract also included the Wennington to M25 motorway section (see below). It has National Speed Limit from just east of Goresbrook Interchange. London Bus routes 173 and 287 are the only routes to use the A13 here, between Ripple Road and Goresbrook.

In 2005, Havering Council commissioned the Litmus Towers sculptures on the A13 junctions near Rainham which display local environmental data using large LED arrays.

Essex

Wennington to Sadlers Hall Farm

The Thames Gateway section of the A13 leaves London at Wennington on the border with Thurrock, still dual three lanes, intersecting with the M25 motorway at Junction 30, close to the Dartford Crossing and Lakeside Shopping Centre. The A13 here is a much older dual carriageway, dating mostly to the 1980s, including the four-lane flyover above the M25, left incomplete for over 15 years. The Wennington to M25 section opened in late 1998. The next junction, the turn-off for Lakeside (A126), has only west-facing slips, so there is no exit westbound. It is then dual three lanes past the junction with the A1089, the road into Tilbury, and loses its Trunk Road status to the latter. The A13 finally drops down to two lanes each way at the nearby A128 junction. It is dual for another , bypassing Stanford-le-Hope and Basildon before it reaches the Sadlers Hall Farm (or Sadlers Farm) roundabout. Here the road meets the A130 and loses its dual and Primary Route status. The main route into Southend is now the A127 Southend Arterial Road, accessible via the A130.

A13/A130 Sadlers Farm Junction

Improvements to the A13/A130 Sadlers Farm Junction were first given government approval in July 2006 following a 2005 public consultation. The project involved by-passing the roundabout by creating a new full-depth cutting link road between the A13 and A130, building slip roads connecting traffic to the Sadlers Farm roundabout and widening the A13 to dual four lane carriageway to Pitsea and the A130 to dual three lane carriageway to the Rayleigh Spur roundabout. The scheme is part of the Thames Gateway transport infrastructure plans which gave it an estimated cost of £63 million in 2007 and timelines it for 2012. The scheme was opened in 2012.

Benfleet to Shoeburyness

The A13 continues east of Sadlers Farm as mostly single-carriageway through Thundersley, Hadleigh, Leigh-on-Sea and Westcliff, before reaching the seaside resort of Southend-on-Sea. It turns to the south at Parsons Corner, and then as Ness Road, it terminates at an end-on junction with the B1016, also forming part of Ness Road.

History

Original route through Newham and Barking 

East of the River Lea, through Newham and Barking, the original route followed the A124  Barking Road and then the A123 Ripple Road. The present A13 still uses much of the eastern end of Ripple Road. The route was replaced by the East Ham & Barking Bypass first opened in 1928, which was given the number A118 before being redesignated. As with the route west of the River Lea, Barking Road is a relatively new route, being built c.1812.

Original route through Dagenham and Havering 

Ripple Road leads to Dagenham. The eastern end of this as well as New Road heading towards Rainham, in Havering, and the Greater London border, were bypassed by the new-build Thames Gateway in 1999. The former route was redesignated A1306. The western end between Dagenham and Rainham is still dual, but a short section near Rainham was singled in recent years. Like Barking Road further west, the original section of New Road between Dagenham and Rainham dates from c.1810, and was dualled at roughly the same time as the East & Ham and Barking Bypass. New Road east of Rainham is much newer, and dates from the 1920s. It is and was single all the way towards the border at Wennington, consequently suffering congestion, especially after Lakeside Shopping Centre opened in 1990.

Original route in Thurrock and Basildon 

The eastern half of New Road originates from 1924, and continues past Wennington as the A1306 Arterial Road, completed in 1925, bypassing Purfleet (the project including that town's now unclassified "bypass"). It subsequently intersects with the M25 and A282 at Junction 31, heads past Lakeside and then ends at the A1012 near Grays. The route continues as the unclassified Lodge Lane before the latter becomes part of the A1013. The A1013 continues as far as Stanford-le-Hope, where the old A13 route merges with new at the A1014 junction. The eastern end of the erstwhile single-carriageway bypass is now a farm access, but can be shadowed on foot, meeting the B1420 at a roundabout just south of the modern A13 (the actual original A13 (pre-1930s) followed London Road and Southend Road through Stanford and Corringham). East of there, the B1420 meets the A13 at the A176 junction at Thurrock/Essex border and then the B1464 London Road continues the route south of Basildon, before meeting the newer road and the A130 at Sadlers Farm. The section of the route between the M25 and Sadlers Farm was by-passed or dualled in several stages between the mid-1970s and early 1990s, with Wennington to M25 opening in 1998 (see above).

Original route in Southend 

In Southend, the short dual carriageway Queensway bypasses the original route through the town centre, and while much of this is pedestrianised, it can be followed on foot. East of the town centre, Shoebury Road was bypassed by the single-carriageway Bournes Green Chase, just a few yards to the north, linking Southchurch with Shoeburyness. Finally, the terminus of the A13 has been truncated, the road formerly ending on Shoeburyness High Street at the railway station.

Proposed route near Southend 

In the 1960s, a route along the lines of the A13 was planned to take traffic to a new airport located at Maplin Sands near Southend. Only preliminary planning was carried out for the road (which may have been designated a motorway) before the proposals for the airport were dropped in favour of expanding Stansted Airport).
The route would have followed a similar route to the current A13 through Barking and Dagenham to Rainham before heading north-east towards South Ockendon then east towards Basildon. It would have continued eastwards between Basildon and Stanford-le-Hope before passing north of Canvey Island and south of Hadleigh, Leigh-on-Sea. The last section of road would have been constructed in the Thames Estuary passing south of Southend-on-Sea and Shoeburyness to reach the proposed site of the airport.

Dump truck incident

In February 2016, Nicholas Churchill, a disgruntled middle aged construction worker stole his employer's mining truck and drove for about 50 km on this highway and other roads. During this time, he drove into various structures and police vehicles. He finally stopped the truck in Brandon where he was arrested.

Management

The section between Limehouse and Wennington is maintained by RMS (A13) Plc as part of a 30-year DBFO deal reached with the Highways Agency in 2000. It was RMS who undertook grade-separation of the East Ham & Barking Bypass section in 2002–2004. RMS also maintain the A1203 Limehouse Link tunnel as well as the Aspen Way and East India Dock Link tunnel sections of the A1261 through Docklands. This latter route runs just south of the A13, is dual carriageway and nearly all grade-separated and acts as an alternative to East India Dock Road and much of Commercial Road.

Despite the DBFO, Transport for London (who took over responsibility for all trunk non-motorway routes in London from the Highways Agency in 2000) still have overall responsibility for the entire A13 section inside Greater London, while the Highways Agency have responsibility for the remaining Trunk Road section between Wennington and the A1089 junction near Tilbury. From there until Sadlers Hall Farm, the A13 is a primary route and is maintained by Essex County Council, as is the non-primary section through Castle Point, although the sections through Southend-on-Sea and Thurrock are managed by their respective unitary authorities.

Cycle Superhighway 3

Cycle Superhighway 3 (CS3) runs along the A13 between Poplar and Barking.

To the east CS3 joins the A13 at the junction with the A1020/Leamouth Road. CS3 runs eastbound, crossing the Bow Creek and Barking Creek and passing through Canning Town and Beckton en route. To the west, CS3 ends at Greatfields Park, Barking, at the junction with Movers Lane/River Road.

West from Canning Town, CS3 crosses over the A1020/Leamouth Road, heading southbound along the pavement until a junction with Sorrel Lane, where it turns right. It is signposted from Sorrel Lane and runs unbroken to Tower Hill in the City and Lancaster Gate, Hyde Park.

For the entirety of its route, CS3 runs adjacent to the westbound carriageway of the A13 (to the south of the road) as a two-way bike freeway. The route is segregated from other traffic, except at some junctions. It is signposted and marked by blue paint.

Between Greatfields Park and the Lodge Avenue Junction, the two-way, segregated bike freeway continues along the southern edge of the A13. The route is part of National Cycle Route 13 (NCR 13), but not the TfL Cycleways network. NCR 13 leaves the A13 to the east of Lodge Avenue Junction, crossing the A13 and joining residential streets as it runs towards Rainham. The northern terminus of NCR 13 is in Fakenham, Norfolk.

Future developments

A13 Passenger Transport Corridor (Southend) 
The scheme aims to improve public transport along the A13; it includes bus stop improvements, provision of real time information and bus prioritisation at signals as well as junction enhancements and road widening. The road widening is planned for a number of points on the Hatley Gardens and Kenneth Road stretch of the A13. Following a public consultation in March 2009, the scheme was approved."The people of Thurrock have been calling for this for more than a decade, now at last the money is in sight and we can start to get things moving." The original estimated cost of the scheme was given at £4 million in the 2001-2006 Local Transport Plan and increased to £4.9 million in the 2006-2011 update. "The government is recognising that a further £80 million more is needed to actually build the scheme."

London

Grade-separation of Renwick Road traffic lights in Barking, the final at-grade junction between Canning Town and Sadlers Hall Farm, was due to be undertaken "in time for the Olympics in 2012". The works may also involve replacement of the nearby Lodge Avenue Flyover (Ripple Road Flyover), but this is subject to available funding and development of Barking Riverside.

The junction with the A406 North Circular Road was built in 1987 and is incomplete. The long-awaited Thames Gateway Bridge is yet to get the go ahead, but if built it will start at a flyover above the A13, thereby linking the A406 with the road network south of the River Thames. As of 2008, the project in its original form was cancelled by newly elected mayor Boris Johnson.

M25 Junction 30

Improvements including widening are being made at J30 of the M25 motorway and at nearby Lakeside turn-off (A126), following a Route Management Strategy undertaken by the Highways Agency.
The work commenced in late 2014 and was scheduled to be completed in autumn 2016.

Junction list

A13 in popular culture
The A13 has inspired at least two rock songs: Billy Bragg's "A13, Trunk Road to the sea", which is a localisation of Bobby Troup's song about Route 66; The music video for the Underworld song "Scribble" also features the A13, with the distinctive fencing on the side of the road clearly visible during the video. There is also the spoken word track called 'A13' featured on the album Without Judgement by Jah Wobble's Invaders of the Heart, in which Wobble intones his deeper, satirical thoughts concerning the "hopeless highway of Essex" over the musical backing of the band. In 2004, British author Iain Sinclair published a psychogeographic road novel, titled Dining on Stones, which loosely follows the route of the A13 from East London to the Thames Estuary. Mike Newman published an account of attempting to walk the route of the A13 in Adverse Camber: An Incomplete walk to the seaside in 2018.

References

External links
A13 road photographs
Society for All British Road Enthusiasts entry for the A13
Adverse Camber: An Incomplete walk to the seaside

 
Transport in the London Borough of Barking and Dagenham
Transport in the Borough of Basildon
Transport in the London Borough of Havering
Transport in the London Borough of Newham
Transport in the London Borough of Tower Hamlets
Roads in Essex
Roads in London
Transport in Castle Point
Transport in Southend-on-Sea
Transport in Thurrock